This is a list of airports in Burma (Myanmar), grouped by type and sorted by location.

Burma, officially the Union of Burma (now The Republic of the Union of Myanmar), has 25 operating airports with commercial flights. 
The country is bordered by People's Republic of China to the northeast, Laos to the east, Thailand to the southeast, Bangladesh to the west, India to the northwest, the Bay of Bengal to the southwest, and the Andaman Sea to the south. The country is divided into 14 administrative subdivisions, which include 7 states (pyi-ne) and 7 divisions (tyne). Its capital is Naypyitaw (Nay Pyi Taw) and its largest city (and prior capital) is Yangon.



Airports 
Airport names shown in bold have scheduled passenger service on commercial airlines.

See also

 Myanmar Air Force
 Transport in Burma
 List of airports by ICAO code: V#VY - Myanmar (Burma)
 Wikipedia:WikiProject Aviation/Airline destination lists: Asia#Myanmar (Burma)
 List of airlines of Burma

References 
 
  - includes IATA codes
 Airports in Burma at World Aero Data (DAFIF data, October 2006)
 Airports in Myanmar at Great Circle Mapper
 Airports in Burma at FallingRain
 Airports in Burma at OurAirports

Myanmar
 
Myanmar transport-related lists
Lists of buildings and structures in Myanmar
Myanmar